Veronika Mosina (born 17 October 1990 in Saint Petersburg) is a Russian triple jumper. She competed in the triple jump event at the 2012 Summer Olympics.

Competition record

References

External links
IAAF profile

Athletes from Saint Petersburg
Russian female triple jumpers
1990 births
Living people
Olympic athletes of Russia
Athletes (track and field) at the 2012 Summer Olympics